Omorgus rusticus is a species of hide beetle in the subfamily Omorginae and subgenus Afromorgus.

References

rusticus
Beetles described in 1857